Victory is a 1938 Soviet drama film directed by Vsevolod Pudovkin and Mikhail Doller.

Cast
 Yekaterina Korchagina-Aleksandrovskaya - Mother Samoylova
 Vladimir Solovyov - Klim Samoylov, stratoplane pilot
 S. Ostroumov - Lomov
 N. Sanov - Gudiashvili
 Aleksandr Grechanyy - Gorelov
 L. Kalyuzhnaya - Liza, Klim's wife
 Z. Karpova - Anya
 Luka Lyashenko - Fomin

References

External links
 

1938 films
Mosfilm films
Soviet black-and-white films
Films directed by Vsevolod Pudovkin
Films directed by Mikhail Doller
Soviet drama films
1938 drama films
1930s Russian-language films